Lake Lure is a lake reservoir near Lake Lure, North Carolina.

History
In 1925, the Morse family created Carolina Mountain Power Company and funded the construction of a dam on the Broad River (through a mortgage) which produced the lake after which the town is named. The full impoundment of Lake Lure was completed in 1927. The dam's power plant began operations in 1928 with the sale of electricity under a 10-year contract to the Blue Ridge Power Company, a local predecessor of Duke Power.

References

attribution contains text copied from Lake Lure, North Carolina

Lure
Broad River (Carolinas)
Lure